The twentieth series of the British reality television programme The Only Way Is Essex was confirmed on 3 June 2015 when it was announced that it had renewed for at least a further six series, taking it up to 21 series. The series launched on 5 March with the cast going to Tenerife, and concluded on 3 May 2017 after eighteen episodes, making this the longest series to date. Ahead of the series it was announced that James Argent had taken a break from the series having only appeared in the first half of the previous series. It was also announced that Mario Falcone, Jamie Reed and Charlie King would all be returning to the series. Lauren Pope also made a return to the series during the final episode, and Fran Parman also made a brief return during this episode.

This was the first series to include new cast members Amber Turner, Myles Barnett, Yazmin Oukhellou, Jack Rigden, Jordan Brook and Jade Lewis. This was the final series to include cast members Ben Shenel and Ercan Ramadan, as well as Kate Wright who announced her departure ahead of the final episode. This series focused on the end of the line for the relationship between Megan and Pete, a divide forming following the fallout between Chloe S and Megan, as well as Gemma focusing her attention on having a baby. It also includes Amber D and Chris.

Cast

Episodes

{| class="wikitable plainrowheaders" style="width:100%; background:#fff;"
! style="background:#81F7D8;"| Seriesno.
! style="background:#81F7D8;"| Episodeno.
! style="background:#81F7D8;"| Title
! style="background:#81F7D8;"| Original air date
! style="background:#81F7D8;"| Duration
! style="background:#81F7D8;"| UK viewers

|}

Reception

Ratings

References

The Only Way Is Essex
2017 British television seasons